Dear Diary is a TV pilot, starring Bebe Neuwirth, written and directed by David Frankel and produced by Frankel and Barry Jossen. After being rejected by ABC, it was slightly edited and put into a single Los Angeles theater for a weekend in November 1996, and went on to win an Oscar for Best Live Action Short Film at the 69th Academy Awards. It was the only made-for-TV pilot ever to win an Oscar.

Plot
TBA

Cast
 Bruce Altman as Griffin
 Bebe Neuwirth as Annie
 Brian Kerwin as Tom
 Rhea Silver-Smith as Sara
 Peter Brown as Peter
 Cheryl Freeman as Elizabeth
 Lisa Louise Langford as Stacey
 Haviland Morris as Christie
 Mike Starr as Fritz
 Ronald Guttman as Erik
 Jeff Blumenkrantz as Ron
 Peter Jacobson as Hal
 Peter Vack as Peter
 Peter Giles as Gary

Production
TBA

Reception
TBA

References

External links 

1996 short films
1996 films
Television pilots not picked up as a series
Live Action Short Film Academy Award winners
American short films
1990s English-language films
Films directed by David Frankel

Films shot in New York City